2020 Premier Badminton League (also known as Star Sports PBL for sponsorship reasons) was the fifth edition of Premier Badminton League. It was played from 20 January and concluded on 9 February 2020. The season featured seven competing teams. Also, the Chennai team previously known as Chennai Smashers featured as Chennai Superstarz. Bengaluru Raptors beat Northeastern Warriors 4-2 in the finals to become champions. It was also their second consecutive title in the PBL.

Squads

Points Table

 Qualified for knockouts
Five matches (MP) constitute one tie
Each team will play six ties
1 point for each Regular Match Won (RMW) 
0 points for Regular Matches Lost (RML)
2 points for each Trump Match Won (TMW) 
-1 point for each Trump Match Lost (TML)
Source: Official PBL website

Fixtures 
All times are as Indian Standard Time (UTC+05:30).

League stage

Knockout stage

Semifinal 1: Chennai Superstarz vs. Northeastern Warriors

Semifinal 2: Pune 7 Aces vs. Bengaluru Raptors

Final: Northeastern Warriors vs. Bengaluru Raptors

End-of-season awards

References 

Premier Badminton League
Premier Badminton League
Badminton tournaments in India
Premier Badminton League
Premier Badminton League
Premier Badminton League